The 2019 Brabantse Pijl was the 59th edition of the Brabantse Pijl cycle race and was held on 17 April 2019. The race started in Leuven and finished in Overijse.

Teams
21 teams participated in the race, including 8 UCI WorldTeams and 13 UCI Professional Continental teams. Each team had a maximum of seven riders:

Result

References

2019
Brabantse Pijl
April 2019 sports events in Belgium